The Presidential Electoral College is an electoral college made up of MPs that elects the President of Myanmar.

Composition
It consists of three separate committees:
MPs who represent the proportions of MPs elected from each Region or State (the House of Nationalities)
MPs who represent the proportions of MPs elected from each township population (the House of Representatives)
Military-appointed MPs personally nominated by the Tatmadaw Commander-in-Chief (the combined military representatives from both above houses of the Assembly of the Union)

Nomination and selection
Each of the three committees nominate a presidential candidate. Afterward, all the Pyidaungsu Hluttaw MPs vote for one of three candidates—the candidate with the highest number of votes is elected President, while the other two are elected as Vice Presidents. The Vice Presidents are designated as First and Second Vice President based on who received the second and third highest number of votes.

2011 election

2016 election

2018 by-election

References 

Electoral colleges
Elections in Myanmar
Presidential elections